Japhet Isidro Amador Hernandez (born January 19, 1987), nicknamed "El Gigante de Mulegé", is a Mexican professional baseball first baseman and designated hitter for the Diablos Rojos del México of the Mexican League. He previously played for the Tohoku Rakuten Golden Eagles of Nippon Professional Baseball (NPB).

Career

Diablos Rojos del Mexico
Amador was born in Mulegé, Baja California Sur. From 2007 through a portion of the 2013 season, Amador played in the Mexican League, last playing for the Diablos Rojos del México. In 2012, he hit 15 home runs through 81 Mexican League games; he hit 17 home runs in 61 games that year during winter baseball in the Mexican Pacific League. In 104 games for the Diablos Rojos in 2013, Amador hit .368 with 36 home runs and 121 runs batted in (RBI).

Houston Astros
On August 18, 2013 the Astros signed him and assigned him to the triple-A Oklahoma City RedHawks. When the Astros signed him, Amador weighed 330 pounds. He played 10 games for Oklahoma City. The organization then sent him to the Peoria Javelinas of the Arizona Fall League.

In February 2014, the Astros reported that Amador was in Mexico dealing with a family emergency, that he would not be reporting for the beginning of spring training and that they were not sure whether he would report to the Astros at all. Amador reported to camp a couple of weeks late, and reporter Evan Drellich wrote that Amador's pregnant wife had been ill. Drellich said that Amador had hurt his already low chances of playing first base with the Astros.

Amador appeared in seven games with Class AAA Oklahoma City early in the 2014 season.

Second stint with Diablos Rojos del México
By May, he had been returned to the Diablos Rojos on the agreement that he would rejoin the Astros organization when the Mexican League season was finished. He hit 13 home runs that year in 64 games with the Diablos Rojos.

In 2015, Amador led the Mexican League in home runs, hitting 41 during the regular season and earning the league's Most Valuable Player award. He hit 14 more home runs during winter baseball in the Mexican Pacific League.

Tohoku Rakuten Golden Eagles
On December 24, 2015, Amador signed with the Tohoku Rakuten Golden Eagles of Nippon Professional Baseball (NPB) after the 2015 season.

On May 25, 2016, Amador made his NPB debut. On November 28, 2016, he signed a 1-year extension to remain with the Eagles.

On November 27, 2017, Amador signed a 1-year extension to remain with the Eagles.

On August 9, 2018, Amador was suspended for six months after testing positive for the banned substances chlortalidone and furosemide, but he stated that he would appeal the suspension, and claimed that he would never intentionally take any banned drugs. Leading up to his suspension, Amador had a .269 average and 20 home runs in 62 games played for the club. Amador became a free agent after the season.

Third stint with Diablos Rojos del México
In 2019, Amador returned to Mexico to play with the Diablos Rojos del México. He hit .346 with 28 home runs and 115 runs batted in that year. Amador did not play in a game in 2020 due to the cancellation of the Mexican League season because of the COVID-19 pandemic. He played for the Charros de Jalisco in the Mexican Pacific Winter League in 2020-21.

International career
Amador was selected for Mexico national baseball team at the exhibition games against Japan in 2016 and 2017 World Baseball Classic.

On October 16, 2016, he was selected for exhibition games against Japan in 2016.

On February 8, 2017, he was selected for 2017 World Baseball Classic.

Personal
In Mexico, Amador has been given the nickname "El Gigante de Mulegé" (The Giant of Mulegé) due to his 1.93 m height.  Only one 300-pound player in baseball history has made the major leagues.

References

External links

1987 births
Living people
Algodoneros de Guasave players
Baseball players from Baja California Sur
Baseball players suspended for drug offenses
Charros de Jalisco players
Diablos Rojos del México players
Mexican expatriate baseball players in Japan
Mexican expatriate baseball players in the United States
Mexican League baseball first basemen
Mexican League Most Valuable Player Award winners
Mexican sportspeople in doping cases
National baseball team players
Nippon Professional Baseball designated hitters
Nippon Professional Baseball first basemen
Oklahoma City RedHawks players
People from Mulegé
Peoria Javelinas players
Petroleros de Minatitlán players
Rojos del Águila de Veracruz players
Tohoku Rakuten Golden Eagles players
2017 World Baseball Classic players